Robert Mitchell (October 3, 1911 – December 1, 1992) was an American weightlifter. He competed in the men's lightweight event at the 1936 Summer Olympics. Two years earlier, Mitchell was the US national champion.

References

External links
 

1911 births
1992 deaths
American male weightlifters
Olympic weightlifters of the United States
Weightlifters at the 1936 Summer Olympics
People from Webster County, Kentucky
20th-century American people